Wexford Festival Opera is an opera festival that takes place in the town of Wexford in south-eastern Ireland during the months of October and November.

The festival began in 1951 under Tom Walsh and a group of opera lovers who quickly generated considerable interest by programming unusual and rare works, a typical festival staging three operas. This concept has been maintained over the company's history under the direction of seven different artistic directors.  From the beginning, the company embraced new and upcoming young singers, many of whom were Irish, but it also included new international names who made first appearances there.

By the 1960s Czech and Russian operas entered the repertory, while the 1970s saw an interest in the operas of Jules Massenet under director Thomson Smillie, followed by an emphasis on Italian operas from the end of that decade. However, into the mix there appeared more modern operas by Benjamin Britten and Carlisle Floyd while Elaine Padmore's 12-year tenure resulted in more international singers making first appearances and the beginnings of commercial recordings and radio broadcasts.

David Agler, the artistic director since 2005, oversaw the creation of a new opera house with enhanced facilities on the site of the original theatre.

Festival origins, growth and development 
Under its founding director, Tom Walsh, Wexford began a steady climb to international success. He was succeeded by a variety of talented individuals who maintained and expanded upon the festival's basic philosophy.

Tom Walsh, 1951 to 1966

The origins of the opera festival lie in a visit to Ireland in November 1950 by Sir Compton Mackenzie, the founder of the magazine The Gramophone, and an erudite writer on music, who gave a lecture to the Wexford Opera Study Circle. Mackenzie suggested the group should stage an opera in their own theatre, the Theatre Royal (subsequently the Festival's permanent venue until 2005), a theatre which he felt was eminently suited to the production of certain operas.

The result was that a group of opera lovers (including Dr. Tom Walsh who was to become the festival's first artistic director) planned a "Festival of Music and the Arts" (as the event was first called) from 21 October to 4 November 1951. The highlight was a production of the 19t-century Irish composer Michael William Balfe's 1857 The Rose of Castille, a little-known opera which had also been mentioned by James Joyce in Ulysses in a striking pun (Balfe is probably best known for The Bohemian Girl).

Setting itself aside from the well-known operas during its early years placed Wexford in a unique position in the growing world of opera festivals, and this move was supported by well-known critics such as the influential Desmond Shawe-Taylor of The Sunday Times, who communicated what was happening each autumn season.

During its first decade, Wexford offered an increasingly enthusiastic and knowledgeable audience such rarities as Lortzing's Der Wildschütz and obscure works (for that time) such as Bellini's La sonnambula was staged, with Marilyn Cotlow as Adina and Nicola Monti as Elvino. Bryan Balkwill, Charles Mackerras and John Pritchard were among the young conductors, working with subsequently famous producers and designers like Michael MacLiammoir. For the time, the results were astounding, and the festival was soon attracting leading operatic talent, both new and established.

Increasingly, it was possible to recruit singers like Nicola Monti, Afro Poli, Franco Calabrese and Paolo Pedani as well as rising British and Irish stars as Heather Harper, Bernadette Greevy, Thomas Hemsley and Geraint Evans.

Due to the renovation of the Theatre, the 1960 season did not take place, but at its re-opening, Verdi's Ernani was presented in September 1961.

Problems in obtaining the Radio Éireann Light Orchestra (now the RTÉ Concert Orchestra) led to the involvement of the Royal Liverpool Philharmonic for this one season, while in the next year the Radio Éireann Symphony (now the RTÉ National Symphony Orchestra) moved into the pit, a role it maintained up until 2005.

The 1962 L'amico Fritz brought the talented young Irish singers Veronica Dunne and Bernadette Greevy to international notice, while other distinguished names from the 1960s included Mirella Freni in Bellini's I puritani. Massenet's Don Quichotte was another standout in 1965 with the veteran bass Miroslav Cangalovic as Cervantes' old knight.

Albert Rosen, a young conductor from Prague, began a long association with the company in 1965, and he went on to conduct eighteen Wexford productions. He was later appointed Principal Conductor of the RTÉ Symphony Orchestra and was Conductor Laureate at the time of his death in 1997.

Brian Dickie, 1967 to 1973

In 1967, Walter Legge, the EMI recording producer and founder of the Philharmonia Orchestra was asked to take over the running of the festival, but within a month of the appointment he suffered a severe heart attack and was obliged to withdraw. The 26-year-old former Trinity College student Brian Dickie took over the running of the Festival. A new era of outstanding singing emerged, with the first operas in Russian and Czech plus a new emphasis on the French repertory as represented by Delibes’ Lakmé in 1970 and Bizet's Les pêcheurs de perles in 1971.

Thomson Smillie, 1974 to 1978

Dickie was persuaded to return to Glyndebourne, but his successor in 1974 was Thomson Smillie who came from the Scottish Opera. He maintained the three-opera format. Much neglected during this period, Massenet's operas quickly became his favourites, and Smillie staged Thaïs in his first season, starting a series of the composer's operas which included the rare Sapho produced in 2001.

In 1976, Britten's The Turn of the Screw was presented along with a rarity in Cimarosa's one-man piece Il maestro di cappella. Other rare Italian operas of the 18th century were presented in 1979 and subsequent years.

Adrian Slack, 1979 to 1981

Adrian Slack concentrated on mainly Italian opera. There were some exception such as Handel's Orlando, Floyd's Of Mice and Men and Mozart's Zaide. Spontini's La vestale was memorable for the incident involving the entire company slipping on a steeply raked, smoothly finished stage, as described by Bernard Levin.

Elaine Padmore, 1982 to 1994

Elaine Padmore had been a BBC opera producer and had supervised transmissions of the productions for BBC Radio 3 and, during her tenure as artistic director, a wide spectrum of music and singers with many remarkable productions made appearances at Wexford. Sergei Leiferkus was introduced to audiences outside Russia along with many other newcomers such as the American dramatic soprano Alessandra Marc during her era. Other outstanding productions included newcomer Francesca Zambello's two productions, the first of Donizetti's L'assedio di Calais in 1991 and Tchaikovsky's Cherevichki in 1993.

A new idea introduced by Padmore in 1982 was the "Operatic Scenes", the presentation of excerpts from operas. This provided a lower-cost alternative for younger audience members as well as offering more work to the chorus, and the idea proved to be very successful.

Michael William Balfe's The Rose of Castile, directed by Nicolette Molnár and designed by John Lloyd Davies, was revived in a professional production in early 1991 to commemorate the festival's 40th anniversary.

Luigi Ferrari, 1995 to 2004

In 1995, Padmore was succeeded as artistic director by Luigi Ferrari, then director of the Rossini Opera Festival at Pesaro and later director of the Teatro Comunale in Bologna. Naturally, he developed his own style by emphasising Italian and late Romantic works such as Meyerbeer's L'étoile du nord in 1996.

In 1994, a four-year series of commercial recordings from the festival was started, in addition to Raidió Teilifís Éireann broadcasts from the festival. Many seasons have also been broadcast by BBC Radio 3. In 2001, the fiftieth festival was a special event marked by the introduction of surtitles.

David Agler, 2005 to 2019

David Agler became artistic director and programmed the 2005 and subsequent seasons. He is an American conductor, previously the music director at Vancouver Opera and resident conductor at the San Francisco Opera.

One innovation, following up from the original idea of "Opera Scenes", has been the "mini opera" concept, presenting the more mainstream works in condensed versions, was developed with success.

Expansion

In a bold move, the festival's home of so many years, the Theatre Royal, was demolished and replaced by the National Opera House on the same site. The first opera in the new building opened on 16 October 2008. Wexford Opera House provides the festival with a modern venue with a 35% increase in capacity by creating the 771-seat O'Reilly Theatre and a second, highly flexible Jerome Hynes Theatre, with a seating capacity up to 176. The architect was Keith Williams Architects with the Office of Public Works; the acoustics and structure were designed by Arup.

In 2006, because of the closure of the Theatre Royal, a reduced festival took place in the Dún Mhuire Hall on Wexford's South Main Street. Only two operas were staged over a period of two weeks, instead of the usual three operas over three weeks. In 2007, the festival took place in the summer in a temporary theatre in the grounds of Johnstown Castle, a stately home roughly 5 km from the town centre.

The National Opera House was officially opened on 5 September 2008 in a ceremony with the Taoiseach Brian Cowen, followed by a live broadcast of RTÉ's The Late Late Show from the O'Reilly Theatre.

See also
List of operas performed at the Wexford Festival.
List of opera festivals

Bibliography
Wexford Festival Programmes (Wexford: Wexford Festival Trust, 1951 ff.)
Smith, Gus: Ring up the Curtain! (Dublin: Celtic Publishers, 1976)
Levin, Bernard: Conducted Tour (London: Jonathan Cape, 1982) (an overview of 12 favourite music festivals, including Wexford)
Schwarzkopf, Elisabeth: On and Off the Record. A Memoir of Walter Legge (London, Faber and Faber, 1988); 
Fox, Ian: 100 Nights at the Opera. An Anthology to Celebrate the 40th anniversary of the Wexford Festival Opera (Dublin: Town House and Country House, 1991); 
Smith, Gus: Dr Tom's Festival Legacy (Dublin & London: Atlantic Publishers, 2001)
Daly, Karina, Tom Walsh's Opera: The History of the Wexford Festival, 1951–2004 (Dublin: Four Courts Press, 2004); 
Lewis, Kevin: What the Doctor Ordered: An Encyclopaedia of the Wexford Festival Opera Since 1951 (Dublin: Nonsuch Publishing, 2008);

References

External links
 Wexford Festival Opera official website

 
1951 establishments in Ireland
Classical music festivals in Ireland
Music festivals established in 1951
Tourist attractions in County Wexford